Sabarkot is a village, founded by ch sabar hussain baharwal which is situated in Gujrat district, Punjab, in Pakistan.

Sabarkot is at an elevation/altitude of 130 meters above sea level.

The local language is Punjabi. Nearby cities are Lalamusa and Daulat Nagar.

Ch Sabar Hussain was a landowner, his father was a very rich Zamindar in khawaspur.

Nowadays his family lives in the same village sabarkot, he has 4 sons 3 of them live in spain and Uk.

Its Telephone Code / Std Code is 50200, and its Pin Code is +92537.

Villages in Pakistan